Ignace Abdo Khalifé, SJ (10 May 1914 in Wady Chahrour, Lebanon – 7 July 1998) was the first Eparch of the Maronite Catholic Eparchy of Saint Maron of Sydney in Australia.

Life
Ignace Khalife joined the SJ and received his ordination to the priesthood on 24 August 1943.

On 20 March 1970 he was appointed by Pope Paul VI Auxiliary bishop and Patriarchal Vicar of Antioch and Titular bishop (pro hac vice) of Apamea in Syria of the Maronites. Maronite Patriarch of Antioch, Cardinal Paul Peter Meouchi ordained him bishop on 5 April 1970 and his co-consecrators were Nasrallah Boutros Sfeir, Titular bishop of the Tarsus of the Maronites and Joseph Salamé, Archeparch of Aleppo in Syria.

On 25 June 1973 Khalife was appointed archbishop (pro hac vice) of the Maronite Eparchy of Saint Maron of Sydney.

On 23 November 1990 Pope John Paul II accepted his age-related resignation. He was co-consecrator of the Eparch Joseph Merhi, MLM as Bishop of Cairo.

On 7 July 1998 Eparch Khalifé died at the age of 74.

Publications
Khalife has published several articles and papers, in addition, he wrote articles for the collective work of the Saint Joseph University.

References

External links
 http://www.catholic-hierarchy.org/bishop/bkhalife.html
 http://www.gcatholic.org/dioceses/diocese/zmar1.htm

1914 births
1998 deaths
Australian Jesuits
Maronites from the Ottoman Empire
Lebanese Jesuits
Maronite Catholic archbishops
Jesuit archbishops
20th-century Jesuits
20th-century Eastern Catholic archbishops
20th-century people from the Ottoman Empire
20th-century Maronite Catholic bishops